The name Daris (also spelled Darris) is a male given name in Europe and North America, while in South America, especially in Brasil, it is used as a female name.

There are sources stating its original meaning is “a student" or "a valuable or precious person" in old Persian language. Some sources state it is a modern Germanic or Slavic version of the name “Dario” (a counterpart of Daris in Italian, Spanish and Portuguese) or Darius (a transliteration/spelling of the name Daris in some languages).

Because of its meaning, it became a very popular name for a male child among academic families in Europe and in North America.

In the last five years, the name became popular in Austria, especially in the state of Salzburg and is very common in USA, UK and Germany. The name is very popular in Bosnia and Herzegovina, especially in and around the city of Sarajevo, and recently became popular in Croatia - mainly in Northern Adriatic. In Croatia it is exclusively Croatian name, while in Bosnia exclusively Bosnian - similar situation as with the name “Damir”.

Given name
Daris Swindler, American anthropologist
Darris Love, American actor
Darris Kilgour, Former professional lacrosse player and coach
Darris McCord, American football defensive

Surname
Joan Darris the protagonist of The Rainbow Cadenza.

See also
Dario (disambiguation), counterpart of Daris in Italian, Spanish and Portuguese
Darius (given name), a transliteration/spelling in some languages

References

Bosnian masculine given names
Croatian masculine given names
English given names
German given names